HJ Shipbuilding & Construction Company, Ltd. (Korean: 주식회사 HJ중공업, Hanja: 株式會社HJ重工業), formerly Korea Shipbuilding & Engineering Corporation (Korean: 대한조선공사, Hanja: 大韓造船公社) and Hanjin Heavy Industries & Construction Co. Ltd.) (Korean: 주식회사 한진중공업, Hanja: 株式會社韓進重工業), is a South Korean-based multinational shipbuilding company, founded in 1937 as  Chosun Heavy Industries Co., Ltd. (Korean: 조선중공업 주식회사, Hanja: 朝鮮重工業株式會社).

Scandals 

7 July, Thousands of protesters clashed with the police in a demonstration against layoffs in Yeong-do, Busan, and Police fired water cannons with diluted tear-water solution on the crowds after warning the crowds to disperse on the streets.

In late September, 2020, the Korea Development Bank (KDB), the main creditor and largest shareholder, announced it would sell all or part of its stake in HHIC. KDB owns 83.45 percent of shares in HHIC. On December 14, 2020, KDB announced that Dongbu Construction, Keithton Partners, and SM Merchant Marine are bidding to acquire HHIC.

In July 2021, the company announced that it had completed the second ship of the Dokdo-class amphibious assault ship for the Republic of Korea Navy, named the ROKS Marado.

See also
Hanjin Philippines shipyard (HHIC Phil)
Economy of South Korea
Hanjin Group
Hanjin Shipping
Korean Air

References 

Sources
Hanjin Heavy Industries
Hanjin Subic Shipyard

Shipbuilding companies of South Korea
Vehicle manufacturing companies established in 1937
Manufacturing companies based in Busan
1937 establishments in Korea
South Korean brands
Companies that have filed for bankruptcy in South Korea